The 2015 season was Bodø/Glimt's second season back in the Tippeligaen since their relegation at the end of the 2009 season. Bodø/Glimt finished the season in 9th position, whilst also reaching the third round of the Norwegian Cup, where they were defeated by Tromsdalen.

Squad

Out on loan

Transfers

In

Loans in

Out

Loans out

Released

Competitions

Tippeligaen

Results summary

Results by round

Results

Table

Norwegian Cup

Squad statistics

Appearances and goals

|-
|colspan="14"|Players away from Bodø/Glimt on loan:

|-
|colspan="14"|Players who appeared for Bodø/Glimt no longer at the club:

|}

Goal scorers

Clean sheets

Disciplinary record

References

FK Bodo Glimt
FK Bodø/Glimt seasons